Harold Harvey (1874–1941) was a Newlyn School painter who painted scenes of working class Cornish fishermen, farmers and miners and Cornish landscapes. He was born in Penzance and trained at the Penzance School of Arts under Norman Garstin and the Académie Julian in Paris (1894–1896).

Private life
Harold Charles Francis Harvey was born to Mary Bellringer Harvey and Francis McFarland Harvey on 20 May 1874 in Penzance. His father was a bank clerk. During his youth, he was home schooled. From 1894 to 1896, he studied art at the Academie Julian in Paris under Norman Garstin. In 1896, he studied at both the Académie Delécluse and the Academie Colarossi.

Prior to 1911, Harvey lived in Penzance. In 1911, Harvey married fellow artist Gertrude Bodinnar. They first met when Gertrude posed for Harvey. She discovered that she had artistic talent and became an artist in her own right in a wide range of visual and textile arts. The married couple lived in Newlyn at Maen Cottage. Friends of the Harveys included Laura Knight, Harold Knight, Annie Walke, and Father Bernard Walke of St Hilary Church.

Late in his life, he converted to Catholicism. He died in Newlyn on 19 May 1941 and was buried in Penzance at the St Clare
Cemetery. Gertrude lived in their cottage until 1960 when she moved into a St Just nursing home. She died six years later.

Career
After completing his schooling in Paris, Harvey returned to Penzance and began working with Norman Garstin. His works included landscapes and life settings of his native Cornwall, religious themes and interiors. He used oil and watercolour paints.

From 1909 to 1913, he was an Associate of the Royal Cambrian Academy of Art, Conwy and, in 1910, he was a member of the South Wales Art Society. From about 1910 and into the early 1930s, he was a member of the Newlyn Society of Artists, particularly with artists from the Lamorna valley.

In 1920, Harvey and his best friend Ernest Procter established the Harvey-Procter School in Newlyn, Cornwall.

Works

Exhibitions
His work was exhibited starting in 1895 as follows:
 In Whitechapel, other locations in Britain, Pittsburgh and Venice
 1895 - Newlyn Art Gallery
 1899 - Newlyn Art Gallery
 1909 - Newlyn Art Gallery - he had his first gallery sale
 1913 - Mendoza Gallery, London
 1914 - Newlyn Art Gallery
 1918 - Leicester Galleries, London - with Gertrude
 1920 - Leicester Galleries, London - with Gertrude
 1921 - Newlyn Art Gallery
 1921-1941 - Royal Academy
 1924-1928 - Newlyn Art Gallery
 1924 - Oldham Municipal Gallery Spring Exhibition
 1927 - Leicester Galleries, London
 1932 - Barbizon House, London
 1937 - Bristol
 1939 - Bristol

Posthumous exhibitions:
 1979 - Artists of the Newlyn School, Part 1
 1985 - Artists of the Newlyn School, Part 2
 1987 - Looking West, Newlyn Art Gallery and Royal Cambrian Academy
 1989 - A Century of Art in Cornwall 1889–1989, Truro, CCC Centennial
 1992 - Artists from Cornwall, 1992 Royal West of England Academy, Bristol

References

External links

Penlee House Gallery biography

1874 births
1941 deaths
Painters from Cornwall
People from Penzance
Académie Julian alumni
Académie Colarossi alumni
British landscape painters
Newlyn School of Artists
20th-century English painters
English male painters
Académie Delécluse alumni
20th-century English male artists